X-Men Unlimited was the title of three comic book series published by Marvel Comics.

The purpose of this title was to run stories that fit between the main X-Men comics. The stories included all characters (heroes and villains) from the X-titles, and the issues were collections of short stories. An anthology title, these stories focus less on the main continuity and more on peripheral events occurring with the X-Men characters. The first two series ran from 1993 to 2003 and the Infinity Comics launched in 2021.

Volume 1 

This title allowed new and lesser-known writers and artists to write and draw X-Men comics. The comics were also usually self-contained stories; with the exception of a tie-in to the Onslaught crossover. This was particularly unique during the late 1990s when most X-Men titles frequently had story arcs that were several issues long. It ran as a quarterly feature releasing four issues per year until late 2002 when it converted into a monthly title.

Volume 2 

The second series ran from early 2004 to early 2006. The series' final issue was in June 2006. Each issue contained two short self-contained stories; in almost every case each story would focus specifically on one character, giving an in-depth glimpse into their psyche.

Infinity Comics 

X-Men Unlimited Infinity Comic is part of the Reign of X line of the X-Men comics featuring a rotating adventures of the Krakoan mutants, with the first arc featuring Wolverine's battle against A.I.M. This title is released in weekly chapters exclusively in Marvel's Infinity Comics.

Collected editions

Collected editions – listed by book

Collected editions – listed by story

References

External links 
 X-Men Unlimited on Marvel.com

Defunct American comics
X-Men titles